Von Adrian McDade (born June 7, 1967)  is an American former basketball player. He played college basketball for the Oklahoma State Cowboys and Milwaukee Panthers basketball teams. In 1991, he was third in the nation among college basketball players in points per game, with an average of 29.6. On December 3, 1990, McDade scored a school-record 50 points in a double-overtime loss to the Illinois Fighting Illini. He was drafted in the second round of the 1991 NBA draft by the New Jersey Nets, but he did not play in the National Basketball Association (NBA).

College statistics

References

External links
ESPN.com Player Page
The Draft Review

1967 births
Living people
American expatriate basketball people in Canada
American men's basketball players
Basketball players from Wisconsin
Iowa Lakes Lakers men's basketball players
La Crosse Catbirds players
Milwaukee Panthers men's basketball players
New Jersey Nets draft picks
Oklahoma State Cowboys basketball players
Quad City Thunder players
Guards (basketball)